Ibado Mohammed Abdulle (born c.1972) is a Somali campaigner for women refugees and internally displaced people who have been forced to move by the impact of the climate crisis. She oversees three displacement camps in the Sool region in Somaliland.

References

1970s births
Living people
Experts on refugees
Humanitarians
Somalian activists
Somaliland people
Somaliland women

Place of birth missing (living people)
Year of birth uncertain